The Lucha Brothers, also known as The Lucha Bros or Los Lucha Bros, are a Mexican professional wrestling tag team consisting of brothers Penta El Zero Miedo/Penta Oscuro and Rey Fénix, and their manager Alex Abrahantes. They currently compete for All Elite Wrestling (AEW) in the United States, where they are former AEW World Tag Team Champions as well as former AEW World Trios Champions with Pac.  In Mexico, they wrestle for Lucha Libre AAA Worldwide (AAA), where they are two-time AAA World Tag Team Champions. They previously appeared in Impact Wrestling, where they are former World Tag Team Champions (and Penta having a reign as Impact World Champion), as well as  Major League Wrestling (MLW), where they are also former World Tag Team Champions, making them the only team to be AEW, Impact, MLW, and AAA World Tag Team Champions.

They also wrestle on the American and Mexican independent circuit and have held numerous titles in both countries including the Pro Wrestling Guerrilla World Tag Team Championship, and The Crash Tag Team Championship. Their real names are not a matter of public record, as is often the case with masked wrestlers in Mexico, where their private lives are kept a secret.

Personal lives 
Pentagón Jr. and Fénix are real-life brothers. Their father and another brother are also professional wrestlers; their father worked as Fuego, while their brother performs under the ring name Ikaro. Pentagón Jr. currently resides in Tijuana, Baja California, while Fénix currently resides in San Diego, California.

Professional wrestling career 
Not much is known about the brothers' previous history beyond what has been revealed by themselves, which is traditional in Mexican professional wrestling (Lucha libre). Both Pentagon and Fenix began training in professional wrestling on the same day, and debuted on the same day.

Pro Wrestling Guerrilla (2015–2019) 
Pentagón Jr. and Fénix unsuccessfully challenged The Young Bucks (Matt and Nick Jackson) for the PWG World Tag Team Championship. On March 18, 2017, Penta el 0M and Rey Fénix defeated The Young Bucks and the team of Matt Sydal and Ricochet in a three-way match to win the PWG World Tag Team Championship. On October 20, Penta and Fénix lost the championship to The Chosen Bros (Jeff Cobb and Matt Riddle), ending their reign at 216 days. On Stage Three of the 2018 Battle of Los Angeles tournament, the Lucha Brothers unsuccessfully challenged champions The Rascalz (Zachary Wentz and Dezmond Xavier) in a World Tag Team Championship match.

AAW (2016–2019) 
On July 23, 2016, Pentagón Jr. defeated Sami Callihan to win AAW: Professional Wrestling Redefined's Heavyweight Championship. On October 8, 2016, Pentagón Jr. put the championship on the line in a Lucha de Apuestas tag team match where his brother Fénix put his mask on the line, while their opponent risked either their hair (Callihan) or their career (Jake Crist). The match ended when Callihan pinned Pentagón Jr. to regain the championship. At AAW "Take No Prisoners" 2018, Rey Fenix and Penta El Zero M beat Myron Reed and A. R. Fox. On February 23, 2019, Fenix and Pentagon Jr. lost their titles again to LAX, in a match which also involved Myron Reed and A. R. Fox after The Young Bucks interfered in the match.

The Crash (2017–2019) 
On January 27, Penta, Daga, Garza and Fénix el Rey announced the formation of a new stable named La Rebelión ("The Rebellion") in The Crash Lucha Libre. During their time in the promotion, they won the vacant Crash Tag Team Championship on November 3, 2018. However, they vacated the titles  24 days later after Fénix suffered an injury.

Major League Wrestling (2018–2019) 
Pentagon made his debut for the U.S. based Major League Wrestling (MLW) on January 11, 2018, where he defeated Fénix as part of MLW's "Zero Hour" show. The following month Pentagon and Fénix (as Los Lucha Bros) defeated "Team TBD" (Jason Cade and Jimmy Yuta) and The Dirty Blondes (Leo Brien and Mike Patrick) to become the first holders of the MLW World Tag Team Championship. At "MLW Battle Riot", Fenix and Pentagon defeated Rey Horus & Drago to retain the MLW Tag Team titles. Following Pentagon's feud with LA Park, Lucha Bros begun feuding with The Hart Foundation (Teddy Hart, Davey Boy Smith Jr. and Brian Pillman Jr.) over the MLW Tag Team Championship. They would go on to lose the championships to Hart and Davey Boy Smith Jr. at SuperFight on February 2, 2019.

Impact Wrestling (2018–2019) 

Pentagón and Fénix debuted with Impact Wrestling on an "Impact Wrestling vs Lucha Underground" co-promoted event at WrestleCon 2018, in a three-way match with Impact World champion Austin Aries. Following the guest appearance the Lucha Bros began working for Impact Wrestling on a regular basis. On January 12, 2019, Pentagón and Fénix defeated Santana and Ortiz of The Latin American Xchange (LAX) during the TV Tapings in Mexico City to win the Impact World Tag Team Championship and start a heated storyline with LAX. The Lucha Bros would successfully defend the tag team championship against LAX on February 2, and then against Eli Drake and Eddie Edwards on March 22. The storyline with LAX culminated at Impact Wrestling Rebellion, in a Full Metal Mayhem match where LAX won the Impact Wrestling Tag Team Championship back from the Lucha Bros. The loss was the Lucha Bros' last Impact Wrestling match for the time being.

All Elite Wrestling (2019–present) 

On February 7, 2019, at the All Elite Wrestling Ticket Announcement held at the MGM Grand Pool Splash in Las Vegas, Nevada, Pentagón Jr. and Fénix made their first appearance with the company. As The Young Bucks were leaving the stage, The Lucha Brothers music played seeing the two teams face off before a brawl ensued with Pentagón striking Matt Jackson first, while Fénix took out Nick Jackson with a superkick. Pentagón then proceeded to hit Matt Jackson on the stage with a Fear Factor, before announcing themselves for AEW's inaugural event, Double Or Nothing. Later on February 23, The Young Bucks made a surprise appearance in AAW Wrestling, attacking Lucha Brothers during their AAW Tag Team Championship defense, costing them to lose the match. The Young Bucks then challenged the brothers to a match at Double or Nothing, which was accepted. At AAA's Rey de Reyes, The Young Bucks defeated The Lucha Brothers for the AAA World Tag Team Championship. This subsequently turned their Double or Nothing match into a rematch for the championship, which The Young Bucks won.

On the October 30, 2019 episode of AEW Dynamite, SoCal Uncensored (Frankie Kazarian and Scorpio Sky) defeated the Lucha Brothers to become the inaugural AEW World Tag Team Champions. Their feud would continue at Full Gear while slowly transitioning into heels, where they competed for the titles in a three-way match also involving Private Party, which SoCal Uncensored won. On the February 5, 2020 episode of Dynamite, Lucha Brothers pinned the AEW Tag Team Champions Kenny Omega and Adam Page in an eight-man tag team match, earning them a title shot which they lost on February 19.

On March 4, they formed a trio along with Pac known as Death Triangle, confirming their heel turn in the process. They made their debut as a team against Joey Janela and the Private Party, defeating them. However, with Pac stuck in the U.K., due to travel restrictions, they then formed an alliance with Eddie Kingston as well as The Butcher and The Blade. On November 18, the Death Triangle returned to AEW Dynamite after an eight-month absence, where Pac won his return match against The Blade and was then saved by Fenix and Penta after being attacked by Kingston and Butcher and Blade after the match and also turning the trio into babyfaces at the same time. At All Out on September 5, they defeated the Young Bucks in a Steel Cage match to win the AEW World Tag Team Championship. On the October 16 episode of Dynamite, they defended the AAA World Tag Team Championship against the team of Las Super Ranas, who turned out to be FTR in disguise. FTR defeated the Lucha Bros. for the titles, ending their record-breaking reign at 853 days. On the January 5, 2022 episode of Dynamite, the Jurassic Express defeated them to win their first AEW World Tag Team Championship, during which Fenix dislocated his arm when being driven through a table.

Following The Elite being stripped of the AEW World Trios Championship following a legitimate fight that broke out after the All Out media scrum, Death Triangle defeated the Best Friends to win the vacant titles on the September 7, 2022 episode of Dynamite.

Championships and accomplishments 
 AAW: Professional Wrestling Redefined
 AAW Tag Team Championship (1 time)
 All Elite Wrestling
AEW World Tag Team Championship (1 time)
AEW World Trios Championship (1 time) – with Pac
 AEW World Tag Team Championship Eliminator Tournament (2021)
 Dynamite Award (1 time)
 Best Tag Team Brawl (2022) - 
 CBS Sports
 Tag Team of the Year (2019)
 The Crash Lucha Libre
 The Crash Tag Team Championship (1 time)
 House of Glory
 HOG Tag Team Championship (1 time)
 Impact Wrestling
 Impact World Tag Team Championship (1 time)
 Lucha Libre AAA Worldwide
 AAA World Tag Team Championship (2 times)
 Major League Wrestling
 MLW World Tag Team Championship (1 time)
 Pro Wrestling Guerrilla
 PWG World Tag Team Championship (1 time)
 Pro Wrestling Illustrated
 Ranked No. 2 of the top 50 Tag Teams in the PWI Tag Team 50 in 2021
 Wrestling Alliance Revolution
 WAR World Tag Team Championship (1 time)
 Xtreme Mexican Wrestling
 XMW Tag Team Championship (1 time)
 Wrestling Observer Newsletter
 Tag Team of The Year (2019)
 Mexico MVP (2019, 2020) - Rey Fénix
Best Flying Wrestler (2020, 2021) - Rey Fénix
 Pro Wrestling Match of the Year (2021)

References

External links 
 

All Elite Wrestling teams and stables
Brothers
Impact Wrestling teams and stables
Independent promotions teams and stables
Lucha Libre AAA Worldwide teams and stables
Major League Wrestling teams and stables
Masked tag teams
Mexican promotions teams and stables
Sibling duos